The Union School District operates six elementary schools (K-5) and two middle schools (6-8) in the greater San Jose, California, USA area. The district serves 4400 students. Confusingly, the district is not a union school district under California law; rather, it was named in honor of the Union Army when founded in 1863, during the American Civil War.

Note: Based on 2002-2003 school year data
*Alta Vista Elementary is in Los Gatos; all the rest are in San Jose.

External links
Union School District Website

For budgetary reasons, the District closed Athenour and Lone Hill schools in 2004, after a local property tax initiative failed to pass.

School districts in Santa Clara County, California
School districts established in 1863
1863 establishments in California